"4 AM" is a single by German electronic dance band Scooter. It was released on 7 September 2012 as the lead single from their sixteenth studio album Music for a Big Night Out. The song samples the 1991 single "Promise Me" by Beverley Craven and "Million Voices" by Otto Knows. Vocals credited to Jaye Marshall. It has gained much success in Russia, becoming their first top 10 hit-single since "Shake That!".

Track listings
Download

UK Download

Chart performance

 *: In Russia Scooter charted mostly in 2013.

Year-end charts

References

2012 singles
Scooter (band) songs
Songs written by Rick J. Jordan
Songs written by H.P. Baxxter
Songs written by Jens Thele
2012 songs
Songs written by Michael Simon (DJ)